is a Japanese musician. He was a guitarist for the noise rock band Boredoms, and has released records both as a solo artist and with several other musicians and bands. He has also composed the soundtracks to several films.

Discography

Solo projects
 Suido Megane Satsujin Jiken videocassette (Augen, 1994)
 Solo Improvisado videocassette (Augen, 1996)
 Noa (Alchemy, ARCD-101, 1998)
 Noa 2 (Alchemy, ARCD-125, 2001)
 Crown of Fuzzy Groove (Weather/P-Vine, 2002)
 Nu Frequency (Tzadik, 2003)
 Nazonazo (Ummo / MIDI Creative, 2003)
 Baptism (Tzadik, 2004)
 X-Game (as Para; P-Vine, 2006)
 Tokyo Loop: Original Soundtrack (Image Forum/P-Vine, 2006)

As co-leader
 Shiawase no Sumika with Phew (Tokuma Japan Communications, 1998)
 Ichi the Killer: Original Soundtrack (Monsoon, 2001)
 Ontoko with K.K. Null (Ummo, 1999)
 Dance with Philip Samartzis (FMN Sound Factory, 2002)
 Live at Showboat, February 25, 2000 with Lamones Young with Mukai, and Chie (Last Visible Dog/Hospital Productions, 2003)
 Hasselt with Enkidu (Turtles' Dream, 2004)
 Kirie: Kabusacki Tokyo Session with Kabusacki, Fernando, Yuji Katsui, Natsuki Kido, Yasuhiro Yoshigaki, Yoichi Okabe, and Takashi Numazawa (Glamorous, 2004)
 Chichipio: Buenos Aires Session vol. #1 (EWE, 2005)
 Izumi: Buenos Aires Session vol. #2 (EWE, 2006)

with Boredoms
 Osorezan no Stooges Kyo (1988, Selfish Records)
 Soul Discharge (1989, Selfish Records)
 Pop Tatari (1992, WEA Japan)
 Super Roots (1993, WEA Japan)
 Wow 2 (1993, Avant Records)
 Super Roots 2 (1994, WEA Japan)
 Chocolate Synthesizer (1994, WEA Japan)
 Super Roots 3 (1994, WEA Japan)
 Super Roots 5 (1995, WEA Japan)
 Super Roots 6 (1996, WEA Japan)
 Super Go!!!!! (1998, WEA Japan)
 Super æ (1998, WEA Japan)
 Super Seeeeee!!!!!! (1998, WEA Japan)
 Super 77/Super Sky (1998, WEA Japan)
 Super Roots 7 (1998, WEA Japan)
 Super Roots 8 (1999, WEA Japan)
 Vision Creation Newsun (EP) (1999, WEA Japan)
 Vision Creation Newsun (1999, WEA Japan)
 Rebore, vol. 1 (2000, WEA Japan)
 Rebore, vol. 2 (2000, WEA Japan)
 Rebore, vol. 3 (2001, WEA Japan)
 Rebore, vol. 0 (2001, WEA Japan)
 Seadrum/House of Sun (2004, WEA Japan)
Yamamoto had left Boredoms prior to the release of Seadrum/House of Sun; the album contains samples of previously recorded guitar work.

with Rovo
 Pico! (Dohb, 1998)
 Vitamin ! / Cisco ! (Roars, 1998)
 Horses ! / Kmara ! LP (Dohb, 1999)
 Imago (Dohb, 1999)
 Pyramid (Dohb, 2000)
 Sai (Warner Indies Network, 2001)
 split with Date Course Pentagon Royal Garden. (P-Vine, 2001)
 Live at Liquid Room 2001 5/16: Main Drive Trance (Rovolone, 2001)
 Tonic 2001 (Tzadik, 2002)
 Flage (Warner, 2002)
 Live at Hibiya-Yaon 2003. 05. 05: Man Drive Trance Special (Wonderground, 2003)
 Condor (2006)
 Live at Tokyo Kinema Club 7/7/2006 with Alejandro Franov, Fernando Kabusacki, and Santiago Vazquez (EWE, 2007)

with Omoide Hatoba
 Surfin' in U.F.O. (EP. Public Bath, 1990)
 Dai-Ongaku (Alchemy, 1990)
 Suichu-Joe (Alchemy, 1991)
 Black Hawaii (Alchemy, 1992)
 Famicon Rally I-V audiocassette (1993)
 Mantako (Public Bath, 1994)
 Livers and Giggers: 1987–1993 (Japan Overseas, 1994)
 Kinsei (Earthnoise/Meldac/Birdman 1995)
 Suger Clip (Trattoria / Polystar, 1997)
 Vuoy (Trattoria / Polystar, 1997)
 Osaka Ra (Dako Vinyl Fantasia, 2004)

with Rashinban
 Rashinban audiocassette (Gyuune, 1994)
 Bunka audiocassette (Gyuune, 1997)
 Rago (Gyuune, 1997)
 Eien no Uta. 3" (Warner Music Japan, 1997)
 Rago (Warner Music Japan, 1997)
 Seika (Warner Music Japan, 1998)
 Psychedelic Sessions for All Incredible Hippies I and II audiocassette
 Rashinban's Live Tips Collection Vol. 1: '97-'99 audiocassette
 Adrenalin Drive (Warner Music Japan, 1999)
 Song Line (Warner Music Japan, 2000)
 Soundtrack to Adrenalin Drive (Beam Entertainment, 2000)
 Psychederix: Impro and More Songs audiocassette
 Psychederix: Impro and More Songs: Nagoya Version audiocassette
 Musubi (Lighthouse, 2005)

with ya-to-i
 The Essence of Pop-Self (Flavour, 2002)

with Akabushi
 Chonmage 3" CD (Satsugai Enka Vinyl, 1994)
 Mademoiselle. Live: T-shirt Kote Kure with Bonjour! (Satugai Enka Vinyl, 1995)

with Guitoo
 Cyclotron (Warner Music Japan, 1999)

with Live Under the Sky
 Live Under the Sky audiocassette (F.M.N. Sound Factory)
 Live Under the Sky / Lost Utopia Total Sound audiocassette (Maboroshi no Sekai, 1995)
 Sky (F.M.N. Sound Factory, 1995)

with Novo Tono
 Panorama Paradise (Alida / Creativeman, 1996)
 Yoshihide Otomo plays the music of Takeo Yamashita (P-Vine, 1999) (two tracks)
 Live (2001)

with Ruinzhatova
 Ruins-Hatoba (Magaibutsu/Charnel Music, 1994)
 Ruins-Hatoba Show video (Magaibutsu, 1995)
 R H (Magaibutsu, reissue of first album, 2001)
 Close to the R H KIKI (Little Mor Rec., 2003)
 sampling CD KAERUCAFE Material Collection/RUINZHATOVA Live in Somewhere (Magaibutsu, 2006)

with Sun Kich
 Lucky Mountain Hey!!!!!!!!!!' (Japan Overseas, 1997)

with Most
 2000.11.26. (2001)
 Most (P-Vine, 2001)
 Most Most (P-Vine, 2003)

with Guillotine Kyodai
 Memorial and Material audiocassette (Maboroshi no Sekai, 1996)
 Suspense Carry Pro (Guillotine / Doubletrap / Creativeman, 1997)
 Viva Guitar (Guillotine / Doubletrap / Creativeman, CMDD-00064, 1997)
 Meetings with Remarkable Men Featuring Junji Hirose'' (Guillotine / Tag Rag, 2000)

In addition to performing in these bands, Yamamoto has collaborated with dozens of other bands of varying genres.

References

1958 births
Living people
Japanese male composers
Japanese composers
Japanese male singers
Japanese rock guitarists
People from Amagasaki
Big beat musicians
Tzadik Records artists
Musicians from Hyōgo Prefecture
Kansai University alumni
Boredoms members